The Treaty of Gyalu was an agreement between Holy Roman Emperor Ferdinand I and Isabella Jagiellon the queen dowager of the Eastern Hungarian Kingdom and the widow of John Zápolya, signed in Gyalu (today Gilău, Romania) by Gáspár Serédy captain of Upper Hungary and János Statileo bishop of Transylvania on December 29, 1541.
The participants tried to renegotiate John Sigismund Zápolya's possessions in connection with the previous Treaty of Nagyvárad. According to the treaty, Royal Hungary and the Eastern Hungarian Kingdom would have been re-united under Ferdinand's rule, in case he had recaptured Buda. However, the Diet of Torda negotiated the Ottoman disapproval in reference to the treaty in October and refused to accept the terms of the agreement on December 20, 1542.

The eastern territories of the former medieval Kingdom of Hungary ruled by King John Sigismund Zápolya were known as the  Eastern Hungarian Kingdom until the Treaty of Speyer (1570).

References

Gyalu
Gyalu
Principality of Transylvania (1570–1711)
1541 treaties
1541 in the Holy Roman Empire
Eastern Hungarian Kingdom
Ferdinand I, Holy Roman Emperor